The 2019–20 Colorado Buffaloes men's basketball team represented the University of Colorado in the 2019–20 NCAA Division I men's basketball season. They were led by head coach Tad Boyle in his tenth season at Colorado. The Buffaloes played their home games at CU Events Center in Boulder, Colorado as members of the Pac-12 Conference. They finished the season 21–11, 10–8 in Pac-12 play to finish in a tie for fifth place. They lost in the first round of the Pac-12 tournament to Washington State.

Previous season
The Buffaloes finished the 2018–19 season 23–13, 10–8 in Pac-12 play to finish in a 3-way tie for fourth place. They defeated California and Oregon State in the first round and quarterfinals of the Pac-12 tournament before losing in the semifinals to Washington. They received an invitation to the National Invitation Tournament where they defeated Dayton in the first round, Norfolk State in the second round before losing to Texas in the quarterfinals.

Off-season

Departures

Incoming transfers

2019 recruiting class

2020 Recruiting class

2021 Recruiting class

Roster

Schedule and results

|-
!colspan=12 style=| Exhibition

|-
!colspan=12 style=| Non-conference regular season

|-
!colspan=12 style=| Pac-12 regular season

|-
!colspan=12 style=| Pac-12 tournament

Ranking movement

*AP does not release post-NCAA Tournament rankings.

References

Colorado
Colorado Buffaloes men's basketball seasons
Colorado Buffaloes
Colorado Buffaloes